Mongoose is a brand name of bicycles originally designed, manufactured, and sold by BMX Products, Inc. It is now available through the distributor Pacific Cycle.

History

BMX Products, Inc.
Skip Hess started BMX Products, Inc. out of his home in Simi Valley, California in September 1974 with his first product being the famous Motomag One wheel. According to Hess, at its largest stage of expansion, BMX Products, Inc. employed about 85 people. In its early years Hess recalled that about 600 frames per day were produced at its Chatsworth, Los Angeles location.

RECO (Racer Engineering Company) was a wholly owned manufacturing division created for insurance purposes to be separate from BMX  Products, Inc, even though RECO was always produced in-house. It was headed by Vice President of Manufacturing Hoppy Brooks, in his attempt to market motorcycle frames.

Post-BMX Products
Mongoose was sold to American Group in 1985 and marketed by their Service Cycle subsidiary.

Bell Sports bought American Group in 1995 and sold Mongoose to Brunswick Outdoor Recreation Group in 1997.

Brunswick sold Mongoose to Pacific Cycle in 2000 and Pacific Cycle was bought by Montreal-based Dorel Industries in 2004. As of 2018, Mongoose models are available through Pacific Cycle in Madison, Wisconsin.
On 11 October 2021 Pon Holdings, headquartered in Amsterdam, the Netherlands announced that they acquired US-based bike company Dorel Sports. By combining Pon.Bike and Dorel Sports, a leading bicycle company in the world will be created, with a combined revenue of around 2.5 billion euro.

See also
List of BMX bicycle manufacturers

References

External links 

BMX
Vehicle manufacturing companies established in 1974
1974 establishments in California
Mountain bike manufacturers
Cycle manufacturers of the United States
Companies based in Madison, Wisconsin